The Old Headquarters Building was located in Austin, Minnesota on the north corner of Main Street and Second Avenue N.W.  It was built in 1856 and 1857 and it housed the town's first court, school, and public meetings.  The first Congregational church services held in Austin were held here. It has since been relocated to the Mower County Fairgrounds and is maintained by the Mower County Historical Society.

Buildings and structures in Austin, Minnesota
1857 establishments in Minnesota Territory